Thomas Elmore Jamieson (February 16, 1924 – April 19, 1993) was a Canadian ice hockey player with the East York Lyndhursts. He won a silver medal at the 1954 World Ice Hockey Championships in Stockholm, Sweden. He also played with the Quebec Aces and Baltimore Clippers, as well as the Harringay Racers, Earls Court Rangers and Brighton Tigers in England.

References

1924 births
1993 deaths
Canadian ice hockey defencemen
East York Lyndhursts players